Robert  or Rob Henry may refer to:

Politicians 
Robert Pryor Henry (1788–1826), American politician, U.S. Representative from Kentucky
Robert Henry (Canadian politician) (1845–1918), Ontario legislator in House of Commons
Robert Lee Henry (1864–1931), American politician, U.S. Representative from Texas
Robert Kirkland Henry (1890–1946), American politician, U.S. Representative from Wisconsin
Robert C. Henry (1921–1981), American politician from Springfield, Ohio, first African-American city mayor
Robert Harlan Henry (born 1953), American judge, politician, and President of Oklahoma City University

Sportspeople
Robert Henry (bowls) (1889/90–1954), New Zealand lawn bowls player
Robert Henry (speedway rider) (born 1954), English motorcyclist and team manager
Rob Henry (American football) (born 1990), American safety and quarterback

Others
Robert Henry (minister) (1718–1790), Scottish historian
Robert L. Henry Jr. (1882–?), American law professor
Robert T. Henry (1923–1944), American soldier and World War II Medal of Honor recipient
Robert Selph Henry (1889–1970), American lawyer, railroad executive and historian
Robert 'Buzz' Henry (1931–1971), American film actor in The Unknown Ranger
Bobby Henry (1952–2011), Scottish guitarist, founding member of the band Bim

See also
Robert Henri (1865–1929), American painter